Mum is a British sitcom written by Stefan Golaszewski centred on recently widowed, suburban 59-year-old Cathy (played by Lesley Manville) and her family, following her husband's death. Each episode is named after a calendar month in the year, except series three which is set over just one week. The series features Cathy's supportive lifelong friend Michael (played by Peter Mullan), and her family: son Jason and his girlfriend Kelly, Cathy's brother Derek and his new partner Pauline, and Cathy's in-laws.

In June 2016, the BBC announced that a second series had been commissioned. In October 2017, it was recommissioned for a third series. The second series premiered on 20 February 2018. Lisa McGrillis revealed that the third series would be the last; it premiered on 15 May 2019.

Cast 
Main
 Lesley Manville as Cathy Walker
 Peter Mullan as Michael, Cathy and her late husband's friend 
 Sam Swainsbury as Jason, Cathy's son
 Lisa McGrillis as Kelly, Jason's girlfriend 
 Ross Boatman as Derek, Cathy's brother
 Dorothy Atkinson as Pauline, Derek's partner 
 Karl Johnson as Reg, Cathy's father-in-law
 Marlene Sidaway as Maureen, Cathy's mother-in-law

Recurring
 Tanya Franks as Carol, Kelly's mum
 Seline Hizli as Debbie, Kelly's friend
 Aaron Heffernan as Ryan, Debbie's boyfriend

Episodes

Production

The interior shots of Cathy's house for both Series 1 and 2 were filmed at West London Film Studios. The show's exteriors were filmed in Croxley Green, Hertfordshire. Series 3 was filmed on location in a country house in Dorking, Surrey.

Broadcast
Series 3 was shown on BBC2 on Wednesday nights starting 15 May 2019, although all six episodes of the series were released at once on BBC iPlayer on the same night as the first episode.

Internationally, the series premiered on BBC First on 11 October 2016. The series premiered in New Zealand on TVNZ 1 on 20 July 2016. The U.S. premiere was 1 July 2018 on PBS.

Reception

Critical reception

Mum has received critical acclaim. On Rotten Tomatoes, the first series holds an approval rating of 100% based upon reviews from seven critics. Reviewers were somewhat critical towards the first episode; in a review for The Guardian, Sam Wollaston gave the series a positive review following its first episode. However, he compared it to BBC Three sitcom Him & Her in terms of its writing, that "it shares the same subtlety and warmth" and slightly criticized the show, mentioning "this is a bit more grownup, (more BBC2 than 3), but Him & Her was ruder, more visceral, sexier and – vital for a comedy – funnier." On his most positive note, he praised the cast performances, "the characters are believable, three-dimensional ones", and in particular, he gave recognition to both Lesley Manville and Lisa McGrillis. Ceri Radford of The Daily Telegraph rated the series 3 out of 5 and commented that episode one was "soothing and enjoyable, but lacks real bite".

Series two received a greater reception and holds a rating of 100% on Rotten Tomatoes based on 17 reviews. The website's Critical Consensus reads that "Mum'''s patient pacing and unflinching embrace of agonizingly awkward family dynamics can make it a difficult watch, but Lesley Manville and Peter Mullan's heartfelt and keenly observed performances make it a highly rewarding experience, too." In a review for the website There Ought to Be Clowns, Ian Foster expressed delight in the series' return, stating: "A hugely successful return for Stefan Golaszewski’s BBC sitcom Mum, with world-beater Lesley Manville in brilliant form once again". Following the series finale, Sarah Highes of The Guardian praised the series and mentioned that "few programmes celebrate humanity, in all its complexity, so clearly" and that "this is a comedy that understands that every aspect of life is worth cherishing."

The third and final series holds a rating of 100% on Rotten Tomatoes based on nine reviews. The Guardians Jack Seale rated the series 5 out of 5 and commented on the show's acclaimed final episode, calling it: "magnificent TV that will put sunshine in your heart" and stating that it is "guaranteed to make you cry four times every episode, the final series of the Lesley Manville sitcom miraculously turns tiny gestures into epic romance. Gabriel Tate of The Daily Telegraph'' gave the show a 5 out of 5 rating and stated "a perfect end to a perfect show - bring on the Baftas".

Awards and nominations

Home media

References

External links 
 
 
 
 

2016 British television series debuts
2019 British television series endings
2010s British sitcoms
BBC television sitcoms
English-language television shows
Television series about families
Television series about siblings
Television series about widowhood
Television series by ITV Studios
Television series by Big Talk Productions